Giovanni Messe (10 December 1883 – 18 December 1968) was an Italian field marshal and politician. In the Second World War, he was captured in Tunisia, but made chief of staff of the Italian Co-belligerent Army after the armistice of September 1943. Later he was an elected representative in the Italian Senate. He is considered by many to have been the best Italian general of the war.

Early life and career
Messe was born in Mesagne, in the Province of Brindisi in the Apulia region of Italy on 10 December 1883. Giovanni Messe pursued a military career in 1901. He saw action in the Italian conquest of Libya and in the First World War. During this conflict, he gave an important contribution to the creation and training of the "Arditi", elite infantry units, and with the rank of maggiore was the commander of the IX Nono Reparto Arditi that fought in the zone of Monte Grappa. Emerging considerably decorated from these conflicts, he became aide-de-camp to King Victor Emmanuel III, holding this post from 1923 to 1927. From this date until 1935, Messe commanded a unit of Bersaglieri and held the rank of colonel.

Abyssinia

In September 1935, Messe assumed command of a motorised brigade in Verona, with the rank of brigadier general. Following a successful period of service with this unit in the Second Italo-Abyssinian War, Messe was promoted to rank of major general and he became commander of the 3rd Cavalry Division.

World War II
In April 1939, following the Italian invasion of Albania, Messe was appointed to serve under Albania's governor, General Ubaldo Soddu.

Greece

From 15 November 1940, Messe commanded the Special Army Corps during the Greco-Italian War of late 1940 and early 1941 and achieved some success against Greek forces commanded by Alexandros Papagos. Before winter had even set in however, the Italian forces were forced onto the defensive, as Greek forces launched a counterattack and moved into parts of Italian controlled Albania.

In April 1941, with the help of the German Armed Forces (Wehrmacht), the Battle of Greece ended in an Axis victory.

Russia

In other circumstances, the armoured warfare experience Messe possessed might have caused him to be given a command alongside Erwin Rommel in North Africa. But, instead, he was chosen to be the commander of the Italian Expeditionary Corps in Russia (Corpo di Spedizione Italiano in Russia, or CSIR).  The CSIR was a mobile infantry and cavalry unit of the Italian army that took part in Operation Barbarossa, the Axis invasion of the Soviet Union.

Initially, the number of Italian troops in southern Russia numbered around 60,000.  Messe never thought that this force was properly outfitted or supplied for the extreme conditions of the "Russian Front".  By July 1942, the far larger Italian Army in Russia (Armata Italiana in Russia, or ARMIR) replaced the CSIR and General Italo Gariboldi replaced Messe.  On 1 November 1942 Messe left Russia.

The number of Italian troops in Russia had grown to about 200,000. Although the troops fought well during the initial summer campaign, they lacked anti-tank weaponry suitable in winter conditions. During the German defeat at Stalingrad, the campaign in the Soviet Union turned heavily against the Axis powers. Alongside Romanian, Hungarian and German forces, the Italian army was severely mauled during Operation Saturn on the flanks of Stalingrad while trying to hold back the Soviet forces.

Tunisia

In February 1943, Messe was appointed as the new commander of the Italo-German Tank Army (Deutsch-Italienische Panzerarmee) formerly commanded by Erwin Rommel. The name was changed to 1st Italian Army in recognition of the fact that the army consisted of one German and three Italian corps. Rommel was promoted to the command of the new Army Group Africa (Heeresgruppe Afrika).

Messe fought a defensive campaign against the advancing American and British forces and was defeated at the Mareth Line. His continuous tactical delay of the Allied offensive could not prevent the inevitable defeat of the Axis in North Africa.

On 12 May 1943 Messe was promoted to the rank of marshal of Italy (Maresciallo d'Italia). On 13 May, the 5th German Tank Army collapsed with the fall of Tunis and the 1st Italian Army was surrounded, still holding the line at Enfidaville. Messe along with Kurt Freiherr von Liebenstein formally surrendered to British and New Zealand forces under General Bernard Freyberg.

Post armistice
As a loyal supporter of the Royalist cause, like many Italian officers Messe soon found himself re-employed, when after the Italian armistice in September 1943, he was made chief of staff of the Italian Co-Belligerent Army (Esercito Cobelligerante Italiano), consisting of those units loyal to King Victor Emmanuel, many of which were reconstituted from Italian POWs and armed by the Allies. He served in this post with distinction until the war's end and then retired from the military in 1947 after 46 years of distinguished service.

Life after the army

Following the conclusion of the war, he wrote a book about his experiences, entitled Come finì la guerra in Africa. La "Prima Armata" italiana in Tunisia (How the war in Africa ended. The "First Army" of Italy in Tunisia). His military popularity remained with him in civilian life and from 1953 to 1955, Messe was a democratically elected representative in the Italian Senate. He was also president of the Italian Veterans Association, a post which he held until his death. His life was profiled in a biography written by Luigi Argentieri titled Messe—soggetto di un'altra storia (Messe—subject of another history) published in 1997.

Giovanni Messe died on 18 December 1968, at the age of eighty-five.

Awards and decorations

 Silver Medal of Military Valor – Gorizia, 21–23 May 1917

 War Merit Cross – Albania, 19 June 1920

 Promotion for War Merits – to Lieutenant General, Valona – Kalamas, 1940–1941

 Promotion for War Merits – to Lieutenant Colonel, 1918''

References

Further reading 

 

1883 births
1968 deaths
People from Mesagne
People of former Italian colonies
Italian generals
Field marshals of Italy
Italian soldiers
Italian military personnel of the Italo-Turkish War
Italian military personnel of World War I
Italian military personnel of the Second Italo-Ethiopian War
Italian military personnel of World War II
Recipients of the Knight's Cross of the Iron Cross
Chiefs of Italian general staff
Italian prisoners of war
National Fascist Party politicians